Three Sisters Cones is a three aligned cones at an elevation of about 1,800 m on the southwest slopes of Mount Erebus on Ross Island. Named by members of the British Antarctic Expedition, 1910–13, under Scott.

Mountains of Ross Island